Gahnia melanocarpa, known as the black fruit saw-sedge, is a tussock forming perennial plant in eastern Australia. Often found in the wetter forests or in rainforest margins, it is common on the coast but also seen in the tablelands.

Overview
The leaf edges are sharp and can easily cut human skin.

The flowers grow in spikes from the centre of the plant and appear in spring and summer. The specific epithet melanocarpa translates from the Greek meaning "black fruit".

The species first appeared in scientific literature in Prodromus Florae Novae Hollandiae in 1810, authored by Robert Brown.

References

melanocarpa
Flora of New South Wales
Flora of Queensland
Flora of Victoria (Australia)
Poales of Australia
Plants described in 1810
Taxa named by Robert Brown (botanist, born 1773)